Woodgrove High School is a public secondary school in Purcellville, Virginia. It serves grades 9-12 for Loudoun County Public Schools.

History 
Woodgrove High School opened at the start of the 2010-11 school year to relieve overcrowding at Loudoun Valley High School.

References

External links

Public high schools in Virginia
Schools in Loudoun County, Virginia
Educational institutions established in 2010
2010 establishments in Virginia